The history of the Jews in Uzbekistan refers to the history of two distinct communities; the more religious and traditional Bukharan Jewish community and the Ashkenazi community.

There were 94,900 Jews in Uzbekistan in 1989, but fewer than 10,000 remained in 2021 (around 38% of which lived in Tashkent).

There are 12 synagogues in Uzbekistan.

Fergana Jewish community
Semyon Abdurakhmanov is the head of the Fergana Jewish community. There are six synagogues in the Valley. There are several hundred Jews in Fergana, Namangan, and Kokand, with about 1,300 total in the area. Abdurakhmanov has said that the biggest problem faced by the Jewish Uzbek community is the economy.

During the Andijan Massacre in May 2005, the Israeli Embassy in Tashkent asked Abdurakhmanov to make a lists of Jews "in case there will be a need to airlift people to Israel."

Historical demographics

The Jewish population of Uzbekistan (then known as the Uzbek SSR) nearly tripled between 1926 and 1970, then slowly declined between 1970 and 1989, followed by a much more rapid decline since 1989, when the collapse of Communism began. According to the Soviet census, there were 103,000 Jews in Uzbekistan in 1970.

Between 1989 and 2021, around ninety percent of Uzbekistan's Jewish population left Uzbekistan and moved to other countries, mostly to Israel.

In the 2021 census, there were almost 10,000 Jews in Uzbekistan, diffused over the country. Over 1,000 were in Bukhara, and almost 1,500 were in Samarkand; around 1,300 were in Fergana, and over 3,700 were in Tashkent. The remaining 2,300 were spread around the country in smaller numbers.

See also

History of the Jews in Central Asia

References